A. Karunakaran (born 25 December 1971) is a Telugu film director known for Tholi Prema (1998), Happy (2006), and Ullasamga Utsahamga (2008).

Career  
Karunakaran began his career as a clap director for Kadhal Desam (1996) after Sasi introduced him to Kathir. He worked as an assistant to Bhagyaraj and Shankar before making his directorial debut with Tholi Prema (1998). He conceived the script while in Madras and cast Pawan Kalyan after seeing him in a magazine. Tholi Prema was a box office success. His second film Yuvakudu was Bhumika Chawla's first film. The film was unsuccessful. His next film Vasu (2002) was not very successful at the box office, but garnered a cult following over the years. Karunakaran collaborated with Pawan Kalyan for Balu ABCDEFG (2005), but the film was a failure unlike Tholi Prema. The following year, Happy (2006), based on the Tamil film Azhagiya Theeye (2004) released and was a box office success. Karunakaran garnered acclaim for  Ullasamga Utsahamga (2008) starring newcomer Yasho Sagar. Darling (2010) released to positive reviews. He then directed a bilingual titled Endhukante Premanta in Telugu and Yen Endral Kadhal Enben in Tamil. The Telugu version released to negative reviews while the Tamil version was never released. Chinnadana Nee Kosam (2014) and Tej I Love You (2018) released to mixed reviews.

Filmography

References

Living people
Tamil film directors
Telugu film directors
Nandi Award winners
1971 births
Telugu screenwriters